Joseph Vincent Nicholas Hawkes  is a Canadian police officer who served as the 14th commissioner of the Ontario Provincial Police from March 29, 2014 to November 2, 2018.

Life and career
Hawkes is a native of Hull, Quebec, and he joined the OPP in 1984. He attended the University of Ottawa (graduating with a Bachelor of Science degree) and later the University of Toronto's Rotman School of Management (Police Leadership Program). Hawkes is also a graduate of the international Leadership in Counter Terrorism program.

He became Deputy Commissioner for Investigations and Organized Crime in 2006, and Deputy Commissioner for Field Operations in 2010.

Commissioner
Hawkes assumed command of the OPP on March 29, 2014, taking over from Christopher D. Lewis. In September 2018, Hawkes announced that November 2, 2018, would be his last day as Commissioner, since he would be retiring, amid much controversy over his last year of work, with regards to treatment of officers experiencing PTSD and other issues.

Awards
 Commander of the Order of Merit of the Police Forces (COM), 2016, previously Officer (OOM), 2010
 Police Exemplary Service Medal
 Queen Elizabeth II Diamond Jubilee Medal
 Honorary doctorate of letters, Nipissing University

References

1960s births
Commissioners of the Ontario Provincial Police
Living people
People from Gatineau
University of Ottawa alumni
University of Toronto alumni